The Indian Navy aims to procure new nuclear-powered attack submarines (SSN) under Project 75 Alpha. The Government of India approved the construction of six of such submarines in February 2015. These will be designed by the Navy's in-house Directorate of Naval Design and built in India at the Shipbuilding Centre at Visakhapatnam. The construction is expected to commence on 2023-24 while the first submarine is expected to enter service in 2032.

Since India is a traditional user of Russian nuclear submarines (with INS Chakra on lease) the new domestically built submarines would be third class of SSN operated by Indian navy after leased Charlie I and Akula II-class submarines.

Development
The program to construct and deploy a fleet of nuclear submarines was first envisaged in late 1990s. Patrolling by People's Liberation Army Navy ships further fast-tracked India's naval expansion programs. As per the initial plan, first 4 Arihant class submarines and later much larger S5 class nuclear ballistic missile submarines, and 6 nuclear attack submarines were planned.

The submarines will be powered by a miniature pressurised water reactor (PWR) being developed by the Bhabha Atomic Research Centre which has already supplied a similar 83 MW miniature reactor for the Arihant-class submarine SSBNs.

On 24 June 2019, it was reported that  have been allocated for the initial phase of the project. The submarines will be designed by Directorate of Naval Design (now call Warship Design Bureau) and the development is expected to continue till 2025. A scaled down model of the submarine is planned to be tested first.

In February 2020, The Economic Times reported that the preliminary design phase of the programme has been successfully completed. The report stated that Submarine Design Group of the Directorate of Naval Design now call warship design bureau , assisted by the DRDO, will now start working on the detailed design and construction phase of the programme.

The Indian Navy has prioritized the construction of Project 75 Alpha submarines over the third aircraft carrier.

Initially three submarines are planned to undergo construction in 2023-24 while the remaining three will get clearance later. The first boat is expected to enter service in 2032. The ship class will have a final design clearance in Gurugram by Submarine Design Group, its nuclear reactor will be built in Kalpakkam, hull fabrication will take place in Hazira and finally assembly and sea trials will be undertaken at the ship-building centre (SBC) in Visakhapatnam.

See also
 Submarines of the Indian Navy
 Future of the Indian Navy

References

Nuclear-powered submarines
Submarine classes
Attack submarines
Submarines of the Indian Navy